Urdazubi/Urdax is a village and municipality located in the autonomous community of Navarre, in the north of Spain.

Caves

Well known because of its caves, Urdax is an interesting place for speleology at a basic level. Urdax caves were created by the underground river Urtxuma 14,000 years ago, and nowadays only a single cave can be visited by the public. The only cave that is opened to those interested in it, is the Ikaburu cave where visitors can enjoy a guided visit through its corridors and stances. The Ikaburu cave tour includes more than seeing the wonderful stalactites and stalagmites, but also stories of witches, shepherds, monks, Spanish Civil War, or even contrabandists.

Monastery

The Monastery of Urdax is said to have been established during the 11th century by an Augustinian Congregation who built a pilgrim hospital there for those who were doing the Way of St James. Even if the monastery is there, the original building does not longer exist due to a fire that happened in 1526 and another one in 1793. The external appearance and architecture in renaissance style, which was not the original style, and the only things that are completely original and did not disappear during the fires are the church and the cloister.

External links
 Information on Ikaburu and other caves in Urdax: Caves of Urdazubi/Urdax
 URDAZUBI/URDAX in the Bernardo Estornés Lasa - Auñamendi Encyclopedia (Euskomedia Fundazioa) 
 Huarte, E. Z. (1979). Ferrerías del real monasterio de Urdax. Cuadernos De Etnología Y Etnografía De Navarra, 11(31), 125–178. 
 López Pereda, M. (2014). Superstición, brujería y esclavitud en una sociedad colonial: Nueva España a mediados del siglo XVIII. 
 Ramalle-Gómara, E. (2011). Una visión antropológica del auto de fe de Logroño de 1610. Berceo, (160), 263–273. 
 Rodrguez, J. J. V. (2012). DUESO, jos: Historia y leyenda de las brujas de Zugarramurdi. De los akelarres navarros a las hogueras riojanas. editorial Txertoa, Donostia-San Sebastián, 2010. 109 pp.. El Futuro Del Pasado, 3, 554–559. 
 Satrústegui, J. M. (2013). Nueva contribución al fondo de textos antiguos vascos. Anuario Del Seminario De Filología Vasca" Julio De Urquijo", 15, 75-104. 

Municipalities in Navarre